The Honours Forfeiture Committee is an ad hoc committee convened under the United Kingdom Cabinet Office, which considers cases referred to the Prime Minister of the United Kingdom where an individual's actions subsequent to their being awarded a British honour raises the question of whether they should be allowed to continue to be a holder. Recommendations are made to the Monarch of the United Kingdom, who has the sole authority to rescind an honour.

Operations
The committee is only convened at the request of the Prime Minister, under the chairmanship of the Head of the Home Civil Service.

The committee conducts its business by correspondence, and only meets to confer about a decision where the probability is to rescind an honour. The committee only considers cases where an individual who has been honoured is judged to have brought the honours system into disrepute, including issues covering someone who:
has been found guilty by the courts of a criminal offence and sentenced to a term of imprisonment of three months or more
has been censured, struck off, etc. by the relevant professional or other regulatory authority for action or inaction which was directly relevant to the granting of the honours.

If there is other compelling evidence that an individual has brought the honours system into disrepute, then it is open to the committee to consider such cases as well. The committee also considers matters of general policy regarding forfeiture.

In 2009, Gordon Brown confirmed that the process remains as set out in 1994 by the then Prime Minister John Major in a written answer to the House of Commons:

All decisions made by the committee are submitted to the Monarch through the Office of the Prime Minister. The subjects discussed by the Committee remain confidential at all times, until confirmed by the Monarch.

Decisions on forfeiture are published in the London Gazette.

Composition
The Forfeiture Committee has a majority of independent members. It is chaired by Sir Chris Wormald (previously Sir Jonathan Stephens), on delegated authority from the Head of the Civil Service. The other members are the Treasury solicitor and three permanent, independent members.

Honours recommended for revocation by the committee

Anthony Blunt: Knighthood, 1979
Roger Casement: Knighthood, CMG, August 1916
Jean Else: Dame, 2009
Fred Goodwin: Knighthood, January 2012
Naseem Hamed: MBE, 2007
Jack Lyons: Knighthood, CBE, 1991
Lester Piggott: OBE, 1987
Harvey Weinstein: CBE, 2020

See also
Honours Committee
Cash for Honours

References

External links
Honours Forfeiture Committee at direct.gov.uk

Orders, decorations, and medals of the United Kingdom
Committees of the United Kingdom Cabinet Office
 
British honours system